The Kingston is an Australian sweet biscuit that have been manufactured since 1926 by the American-owned Australian-based biscuit company, Arnott's Biscuits Holdings.

The Kingston biscuit consists of two individual, rounded, coconut biscuits with a chocolate cream filling. The Kingston Biscuit falls under the 'Delicious Creams' family of Arnotts' sweet biscuits. The Kingston is widely available in Australia, sold in most supermarkets in  packages of twelve individual biscuits, or as one of the five biscuits in the Arnott's Assorted Creams  variety pack. It is commonly believed to be named after a city located near Hobart.

The Kingston was ranked as No. 2 on Good Food's 2019 list ranking in the Arnotts' Family Assorted biscuits.

References 

Biscuit brands
Australian cuisine
Australian brands